Aníbal Hernán Chalá Ayoví (born 9 May 1996) is an Ecuadorian professional footballer who plays as a left-back for Liga MX club Atlas and the Ecuador national team.

Club career
Chalá began his career with El Nacional in 2013, before joining Major League Soccer side FC Dallas on 14 December 2016. He was then loaned out to L.D.U. Quito until 31 December 2017.

On 6 June 2019, Deportivo Toluca announced that they had signed Chalá. He was loaned to French club Dijon for the 2020–21 season.

International career
Chalá made his international debut for the Ecuador national football team in a 4–3 defeat against Qatar on 12 October 2018 in Doha.

Honours
LDU Quito
Ecuadorian Serie A: 2018

Atlas
Liga MX: Apertura 2021, Clausura 2022
Campeón de Campeones: 2022

References

External links
 
 FC Dallas profile
 Documentary

1996 births
Living people
Association football defenders
Ecuadorian footballers
Ecuador international footballers
People from Mira Canton
Ecuadorian Serie A players
Liga MX players
Ligue 1 players
C.D. El Nacional footballers
FC Dallas players
L.D.U. Quito footballers
Deportivo Toluca F.C. players
Dijon FCO players
Atlas F.C. footballers
Designated Players (MLS)
Ecuadorian expatriate footballers
Expatriate soccer players in the United States
Ecuadorian expatriate sportspeople in the United States
Expatriate footballers in Mexico
Ecuadorian expatriate sportspeople in Mexico
Expatriate footballers in France
Ecuadorian expatriate sportspeople in France